The Croxson House is a historic house in Little Rock, Arkansas.  It is a two-story frame structure, with a side gambrel roof that has wide shed-roof dormers, and clapboard siding.  A porch extends across the front, supported by heavy Tuscan columns, with brackets lining its eave.  The house was built in 1908 to a design by the noted Arkansas architect Charles L. Thompson.  It is well-preserved example of Thompson's Dutch Colonial designs.

The house was listed on the National Register of Historic Places in 1982, and was included in an enlargement of the Governor's Mansion Historic District.

See also
National Register of Historic Places listings in Little Rock, Arkansas

References

Houses on the National Register of Historic Places in Arkansas
Colonial Revival architecture in Arkansas
Houses completed in 1908
Houses in Little Rock, Arkansas
National Register of Historic Places in Little Rock, Arkansas
Historic district contributing properties in Arkansas
1908 establishments in Arkansas